This discography lists the recordings Rivers Cuomo has released as a solo artist.

Studio albums

Singles

As Lead Artist

As featured artist

Other appearances
 Homie – "American Girls," from the Meet the Deedles soundtrack (1998): vocals, guitar, songwriting and melody
 The Rentals – "My Head Is in the Sun," from Seven More Minutes (1999): co-written with Matt Sharp, but does not appear on the track itself
 Crazy Town – "Hurt You So Bad," from Darkhorse (2002): guitar solo
 Mark Ronson – "I Suck," from Here Comes the Fuzz (2003): vocals, guitar, production
 The Relationship – "Hand to Hold" (2007): co-written with Brian Bell, a reworked version of the early Make Believe era outtake "Private Message"
 Sugar Ray – "Love Is the Answer" (2009): written by and featuring Cuomo
 Adam Lambert - "Pick U Up" (2009): co-writer
 Kevin Rudolf - "Must Be Dreamin'" from To the Sky (2010): vocals, co-writer
 Katy Perry - "Work It" (unreleased track) from Teenage Dream (2010): co-writer
 Miranda Cosgrove - "High Maintenance" from High Maintenance (2011): vocals, co-writer
 All Time Low - "I Feel Like Dancin'" from Dirty Work (2011): co-writer
 Panic! at the Disco - "Freckles" (unreleased track) from Vices and Virtues (2011): co-writer
 Hitomi - "Rollin' wit da Homies" from Spirit (2011): vocals, co-writer
 CeeLo Green - "Anyway" from The Lady Killer (The Platinum Edition) (2011): co-writer
 Charli XCX - "Hanging Around" from Sucker (2014): co-writer
 McBusted - "Getting it Out" from McBusted (2014): co-writer
 Steve Aoki - "Light Years" from Neon Future II (2015): vocals
 Lindsey Stirling featuring Lecrae - "Don't Let This Feeling Fade" from Brave Enough (2017): vocals, co-writer
 Vic Mensa featuring Weezer - "Homewrecker" from The Autobiography (2017): vocals, co-writer; samples Weezer's "The Good Life"
 New Politics - "Tell Your Dad" from Lost In Translation (2017): vocals
 5 Seconds of Summer - "Why Won't You Love Me" from Youngblood (2018): co-writer
 Asian Kung-Fu Generation - "Clock Work" and "Dancing Girl" from Hometown (2018): co-writer
 The All-American Rejects - "Send Her to Heaven" from Send Her to Heaven EP (2019) : co-writer
 Awolnation - "Pacific Coast Highway in the Movies" from Angel Miners & the Lightning Riders (2020): vocals, co-writer
 Todd Rundgren - "Down with the Ship" from Space Force (2021): vocals, co-writer
 San Holo featuring Weezer - "Wheels Up" from bb u ok? (2021): vocals, co-writer
 Morgan Evans- "Country Outta My Girl" from Country Outta My Girl Remix (2022): vocals, co-writer

Notes

References

Rock music discographies
Discographies of American artists